Potemnemus scabrosus is a species of beetle in the family Cerambycidae. It was described by Olivier in 1790. It is known from Papua New Guinea and Indonesia.

References

Lamiini
Beetles described in 1790